Dragon Park is the largest theme park in Southeast Asia located in Ha Long, Quang Ninh, Vietnam. It opened on January 25, 2017. The amusement park is part of a large resort complex known as Sun World Halong Complex that includes an aerial tramway called the Queen Cable Car, Sun Wheel — a large observation wheel, as well as gardens, restaurants, a shopping district and a family entertainment center with arcade games. The Typhoon water park opened in April 2017.  The park was designed in 2015 by International Theme Park Services, Inc. (Cincinnati, Ohio) in collaboration with Wyatt Design Group and Hetzel Design, both based in California.

Ownership
Dragon Park, including the SunWorld HaLong resort, is owned by Sun Group, a Vietnamese investment group that was established in 2007 and specializes in hospitality, real estate development and construction.

Roller coasters

Attractions

In addition to three roller coasters, the park has 29 rides including the drop tower, Rhino Sling; the Royal Carousel, Tow boat ride, Tea Cups, Little Dragon's Run, Circus Train and Garden Cruisers — a boat ride through tropical gardens. Coming from France, the Topple Tower Tang'Or moved to Dragon Park and is named Crazy Crane.

References

Amusement parks in Vietnam
Buildings and structures in Quảng Ninh province
Tourist attractions in Quảng Ninh province
Amusement parks opened in 2017
Double-deck transport